The Way to Santiago is a 1940 thriller novel by the British writer Arthur Calder-Marshall. It revolves around the shooting of an American newspaperman in Mexico City, leading to the exposure of a Nazi-backed organisation to launch a coup against the Mexican government.

Orson Welles wrote a screenplay based on the novel, and planned to shoot it in Mexico with Dolores del Río in the female lead. However his studio RKO was unwilling to back the project.

References

Bibliography
 Benamou, Catherine L. It’s All True: Orson Welles’s Pan-American Odyssey. University of California Press, 2007.
 McBride, Joseph. What Ever Happened to Orson Welles?: A Portrait of an Independent Career. University Press of Kentucky, 2014.

1940 British novels
Novels set in Mexico
British spy novels
British thriller novels
Jonathan Cape books